Cascadian  (foaled 26 March 2015) is a British bred and Australian raced Group 1 winning racehorse.

Background

A homebred for Godolphin, Cascadian is the son of Epsom Derby hero New Approach and is the best of three winners out of the talented Street Cry mare Falls Of Lora, whose four wins included the Group III UAE Oaks and the Listed Coral Distaff at Sandown.

Racing career

Cascadian began his racing career in France under the guidance of trainer André Fabre.  He raced on six occasions for three wins and two seconds, with his best result a second placing when beaten a short neck in the Group 1 Prix Jean Prat at Deauville.

Having been gelded, Cascadian was then transferred to Godolphin's training operation in Australia to continue his career. Godolphin's French representative Lisa-Jane Graffard explained,  “We’ve had good results with horses that we've sent there from 1400 to 1600 metres.”

Cascadian proved successful in Australia when winning the 2020 Doncaster Prelude.  He finally achieved Group 1 success when winning the 2021 Doncaster Mile at Randwick.

Cascadian won his second Group One race when successful in the 2022 All Aged Stakes when ridden by James McDonald, defeating Tofane by a length.

Pedigree

References 

Racehorses bred in the United Kingdom
Racehorses trained in Australia
2015 racehorse births
Racehorses trained in France
Thoroughbred family 3-n